, established in 1705 by Hata Rokuberi ( Moriyoshi Rokuzaemon Hata and Rokubei Moritsune Hata), an employee of Kyoto's Imperial Palace and an incense hobbyist, is one of the oldest incense companies in Japan. The company is based in Kyoto, with shops in five cities in Japan, and one in America.

Name 

The name "Shoyeido" (Shōeidō) is derived from the three characters Shō, Ei, and Dō. 

Shō means "Pine tree"
Ei is the ancient sound meaning "Prosperity"
Dō is a store or company.

The Shō is from the traditional Sho Chiku Bai trio of shō (松 pine tree), chiku (竹 bamboo) and bai (梅 plum tree), which are used as a traditional Japanese grading system, to represent varying degrees of quality. In this grading system, shō represents the highest grade or quality.

Stores 
Shoyeido has several stores in Japan across five cities, including four in Kyōto, three in Tōkyō, one in Sapporo, and one in Boulder, Colorado, USA.

Incense 
Shoyeido carries several series of incense. The following tables are ordered from least expensive to most expensive.

See also
 Incense in Japan

References

External links
Shoyeido website (available in English and Japanese)

1705 establishments in Japan
Companies established in the 18th century
Japanese incense companies
Companies based in Kyoto